Valentin Zubiaurre Urionabarrenechea (13 February 1837 – 13 January 1914) was a Spanish composer who was a professor at the Madrid Royal Conservatory and worked at the Chapel Royal.

Life
Zubiaurre was born in Garay, a Basque town in the province of Biscay on 13 February 1837. His first musical experience was as a choirboy in Bilbao, and he later went on to study the organ. He traveled to Latin America in 1852, where he taught music until 1866, when he returned to Spain. This proved to be fruitful, as in 1869 he won the National Music Competition for an opera called Ferdinand Set.

He was noticed by authorities and received a scholarship from the Academy of Fine Arts, with which he visited France, Germany and Italy to study. Upon his return he entered the Chapel Royal, which he eventually became master of in 1878. At the chapel he composed religious music and audition pieces for applicants. In this year he also became a professor at the Madrid Conservatory, where he composed the Audition Piece for Trumpet, one of his only compositions still used for the purpose of examination.

Known works

Solo pieces
Audition Piece for Trumpet
Fantasy for horn with piano accompaniment
Oboe solo with piano accompaniment

Operas
Luis de Camoes
Ferdinand Set
Leda

Orchestral
Symphony in E major (1870)

Religious music
St. Matthew Passion
5 Masses
Requiem
Salve
Stabat Mater
Motets

Piano
2 Sonatas

References

1837 births
1914 deaths
19th-century classical composers
19th-century French male musicians
20th-century classical composers
20th-century Spanish musicians
Basque classical composers
Spanish Romantic composers
Spanish classical composers
Spanish male classical composers
Spanish opera composers
Academic staff of the Madrid Royal Conservatory
Male opera composers
People from Durangaldea
20th-century French male musicians